Athrips eugenii is a moth of the family Gelechiidae. It is found in Kyrgyzstan and Uzbekistan. The habitat consists of forest-steppes.

The wingspan is 14–17 mm. The forewings are uniform grey with two indistinct dark spots at about one-third. The hindwings are light grey. Adults are on wing in July.

References

Moths described in 2005
Athrips
Moths of Asia